Norman Manley International Airport , formerly Palisadoes Airport, is an international airport serving Kingston, Jamaica, and is located south of the island  away from the centre of New Kingston. It is the second busiest airport in the country after Sangster International Airport, recording 629,400 arriving passengers in 2020 and 830,500 in 2021. Over 130 international flights a week depart from Norman Manley International Airport. Named in honour of Jamaican statesman Norman Manley, it is a hub for Caribbean Airlines. It is located on the Palisadoes tombolo in outer Kingston Harbour; it fronts the city on one side and the Caribbean Sea on the other.

History

Jamaica has long had a vibrant civil aviation industry, with the first flight reported in the island on 21 December 1911. This was eight years after the world recorded its first powered flight by the Wright brothers. Nineteen years later, on 3 December 1930, the first commercial flight, a Consolidated Commodore twin-engine flying boat operated by Pan American Airways (which eventually became Pan American World Airways), landed in Kingston Harbour.

The year 1934 was also another historic period for the nation's aviation industry when Dr. Albert Edward Forsythe and C. Alfred "Chief" Anderson (the fathers of African American aviation) arrived in Jamaica from Cuba. This was the first time a land plane arrived at the island by air.

The significant growth in the aviation sector led to the establishment of the Civil Aviation Department (CAD) in 1947. One year later, in 1948, the Kingston Air Traffic Control Centre (KATCC) was established. In the same year, the Palisadoes Airport (now Norman Manley International) and the Montego Bay Airport now Sangster International Airport were established.

The airport was featured in the first James Bond film, Dr. No (1962).

From October of 1968, it was the hub for Jamaica's flag carrier, Air Jamaica, until that airline ceased operations during 2015.

Renovation

Existing terminal renovation
The contract relating to additions and alterations to the departure concourse has been awarded to Kier Construction Limited and is valued at $161.5M. The work will include construction of a new canopy, north of the existing check-in concourse and departure lounge; construction of an additional drop-off pavement area and provision for access by wheelchair passengers; new lifts, electrical air conditioning, public address, fire detection and fire fighting services; and alterations to the existing check-in concourse and mezzanine level to include a new security post and postal agency.

The architect / engineer for the designs are Llewelyn Davies, Jabobs Consultancy & Leading Edge Aviation Planning Professionals Limited (LEAPP), in conjunction with Peter Jervis and Associates Limited and Grace Ashley and Associates.

Masterplan

The project seeks to increase the airport's capacity to cater for projected air and passenger traffic at an acceptable level of service to the year 2023. The project is part of a 20-year masterplan which will be implemented in three phases (1A, 1B and 2) and will cost about $130M. By 2022, it will have involved a virtual reconstruction of the entire airport.

The first phase of construction and renovation was completed in 2007. Construction started in June 2006; the intention is for the first phase – which is supposed to make the airport an IATA category C airport – was completed in 2007. The European Investment Bank is providing $40M (2006) for the project and the Caribbean Development Bank has approved a loan of $11m (June 2006) for the new project.

Phase 1A
Phase 1A commenced planning in 2004 and was completed in 2007 at an estimated cost of $80M (ground-breaking took place in September 2006). This phase comprises a new departures building at the eastern end of the present terminal to accommodate expansion to the present departure concourse, security screening station with space to accommodate explosives detection equipment, out-going immigration, retail concessions and departure lounge.

Additionally a new multi-level passenger finger (pier) that enables the separation of arriving and departing passengers, as required by security regulations, was included.

Other items in this phase included:
 Nine passenger loading bridges at the new finger (pier)
 Upgraded roadway system and expanded public car park
 Major rehabilitation of the existing departures concourse and related underground services infrastructure
 Major rehabilitation and upgrading of the terminal arrivals area, including immigration hall, customs hall, arrivals arcade, arrivals duty-free shops and offices
 Replacement and upgrading of airport systems – public address, access control, flight information, baggage information, security control and other airport IT systems
 Cargo warehouse complex (the first phase of this complex, called the NMIA cargo and logistics centre, was completed in 2005)

Phase 1B
Phase 1B was completed in 2010, and cost approximately $23M. Works under this phase included:
 Further upgrading of existing buildings
 Construction of a new arrivals area
 Installation of new baggage handling facilities
 Movement of the General Aviation Centre, the fire station and other support facilities
 Airside works including the expansion of aircraft parking stands
 Extension of the cargo and maintenance taxiway

Phase 2
Phase 2, which is the final phase of the project, commenced in 2013 and is to end in 2022. This phase will involve additional improvement and maintenance works to the terminal, landside, airfield and support areas of the facility at a cost of $9M.

Airlines and destinations

Passenger

Cargo

Statistics

Accidents and incidents
On 10 April 1953, a Lockheed Lodestar piloted by Captain Owen Roberts lost an engine on takeoff, climbed to 100–200 feet entering a slight banking turn and crashed into the sea. The failure of the left engine which was proven to be due to the cracking of the accessory drive gear. 13 on board, including the pilot, were killed. There was only one known survivor. 
On 17 July 1960, the captain of a Vickers Viscount of Cubana de Aviación hijacked the aircraft on a flight from José Martí International Airport, Havana, to Miami International Airport, Florida. The aircraft landed at Palisadoes Airport where the captain requested political asylum.
On 22 December 2009, American Airlines Flight 331, a Boeing 737-800, overshot the runway shortly after 10:00pm during a heavy rain storm and broke up into three pieces, finally coming to a stop approximately 15–20 feet from the sea. All passengers and crew exited the aircraft safely.

See also
List of the busiest airports in the Caribbean

References

External links
 Norman Manley International Airport, official website
 Airports Authority of Jamaica
 http://www.palgag.co.il/?CategoryID=246
 Leading Edge Aviation Planning Professionals Limited (LEAPP)
 
 

Airports in Jamaica
Buildings and structures in Kingston, Jamaica